Ignasi Vilarrasa Palacios (born 23 August 1999) is a Catalan footballer who plays for SD Huesca as a left back.

Club career
Born in Granollers, Barcelona, Catalonia, Vilarrasa joined FC Barcelona's La Masia in 2007, from CF La Torreta. Released in 2009, he subsequently represented CF Mollet, CF Damm and UE Cornellà, finishing his formation with the latter in 2018.

In August 2018, Vilarrasa returned to Barça after agreeing to a three-year contract, but returned to Cornellà on loan for the season. He made his senior debut on 6 October, starting in a 0–0 Segunda División B away draw against CD Castellón.

On 28 December 2018, after just nine league matches, Vilarrasa returned to Barcelona and was assigned to the reserves also in the third division. The following 3 September, he signed a three-year deal with another reserve team, Real Valladolid Promesas in the same category.
 
Vilarrasa made his first team debut on 5 January 2021, starting in a 3–2 away win against Marbella FC, for the season's Copa del Rey. His professional debut occurred on the 26th, as he played the full 90 minutes in a 2–4 home loss against Levante UD, also for the national cup. At the end of his contract at Valladolid he signed for Atlético Baleares in the third division.

On 5 July 2022, Vilarrasa signed a two-year contract with SD Huesca in Segunda División.

References

External links

1999 births
Living people
Footballers from Granollers
Spanish footballers
Association football defenders
Primera Federación players
Segunda División B players
FC Barcelona Atlètic players
UE Cornellà players
Real Valladolid Promesas players
Real Valladolid players
CD Atlético Baleares footballers
SD Huesca footballers